Romaric Yapi (born 13 July 2000) is a French professional footballer who plays as a defender for Eredivisie club Vitesse.

Career

Paris Saint-Germain 
Yapi is a product of the Paris Saint-Germain Academy. He played in Thiago Motta's U19 team in his last year at the Parisian club before joining the academy of Brighton & Hove Albion in England. Yapi never made a professional appearance for Paris Saint-Germain, but participated in a friendly match against Dynamo Dresden on 17 July 2019.

Brighton & Hove Albion
On 25 September 2019, Yapi made his professional debut for Brighton & Hove Albion in a 3–1 defeat at home against Aston Villa in the EFL Cup in what ultimately was his only appearance the senior side.

Vitesse

Yapi signed for Eredivisie side Vitesse on 11 July 2021 after 2 years in England. He made his debut on 15 August in the opening game of the 2021–22 season, coming on as an 86th-minute substitute to help close out the game in a 1–0 away victory at PEC Zwolle. He made his first start and home debut a week later in a 3–0 loss against Willem II.

Personal life 
Yapi was born in Évry in the Île-de-France region of France. He is of Ivorian origin.

Career statistics

References

2000 births
Living people
French footballers
French sportspeople of Ivorian descent
Black French sportspeople
Association football defenders
Paris Saint-Germain F.C. players
Brighton & Hove Albion F.C. players
SBV Vitesse players
Championnat National 2 players
Eredivisie players
French expatriate footballers
Expatriate footballers in England
Expatriate footballers in the Netherlands
French expatriate sportspeople in England
French expatriate sportspeople in the Netherlands